Saint Egwad  was a 7th-century Catholic bishop and Saint of Wales.

He built a church at Ystrad Tywi. He is the Patron Saint of Llanegwad, Wales, and in the Middle Ages there was a festival at this town, in his honour. He is also commemorated in the church at Llanfynydd, Carmarthenshire.

References

7th-century Christian saints
Year of birth unknown
Welsh hermits
History of Carmarthenshire
7th-century Christian monks
7th-century Welsh bishops